Yanqha (Aymara for bad, Quechua yanqha, yanqa, useless, trivial, unimportant, Hispanicized spelling Yancca) is a mountain in the Andes of Peru, about  high. It is situated in the Arequipa Region, Castilla Province, on the border of the districts Ayo and Uñón. Yanqha lies south of the mountains Yanawara and Yana Urqu (Quechua for "black mountain", Hispanicized Yana Orcco) and north of the mountain Qullpa.

References

Mountains of Peru
Mountains of Arequipa Region